Solanum glaucescens is a species of flowering plant in the family Solanaceae and is endemic to Mexico. The fruit is a berry that is green at first, later turning orange.

This species was first formally described in 1837 by Joseph Gerhard Zuccarini in Abhandlungen der Mathematisch-Physikalischen Classe der Königlich Bayerischen Akademie der Wissenschaften.

Solanum glaucescens is endemic to Mexico where it grows in forest, and has been introduced to Cuba.

References

glaucescens
Plants described in 1837
Taxa named by Joseph Gerhard Zuccarini